Argolis or Argolida (in ancient Greek and Katharevousa) is one of the regional units of Greece. It is part of the region of Peloponnese, situated in the eastern part of the Peloponnese peninsula and part of the tripoint area of Argolis, Arcadia and Corinthia.  Much of the territory of this region is situated in the Argolid Peninsula.

Geography
Most arable land lies in the central part of Argolis. Its primary agricultural resources are oranges and olives. Argolis has a coastline on the Saronic Gulf in the northeast and on the Argolic Gulf in the south and southeast. Notable mountains ranges are the Oligyrtos in the northwest, Lyrkeio and Ktenia in the west, and Arachnaio and Didymo in the east.

Argolis has land borders with Arcadia to the west and southwest, Corinthia to the north, and the Islands regional unit (Troezen area) to the east. Ancient Argolis included Troezen.

History

Parts of the history of the area can be found in the articles on Argos, Mycenae, Epidaurus, Nafplio, Troezen, Ermioni, Kranidi, Tiryns and Tolo.

Modern history
From 1833 to 1899, Argolis was part of Argolidocorinthia, which included present Corinthia, Hydra, Spetses and Kythira. It joined Corinthia to form Argolidocorinthia again in 1909. Forty years later, in 1949, Argolis was finally separated from Corinthia.

Administration
The regional unit Argolis is subdivided into 4 municipalities. These are (number as in the map in the infobox):
 Argos-Mykines (2)
 Epidaurus (Epidavros, 3)
 Ermionida (4)
 Nafplio (1)

Prefecture
As a part of the 2011 Kallikratis government reform, the regional unit Argolis was created out of the former prefecture Argolis. The prefecture had the same territory as the present regional unit. At the same time, the municipalities were reorganised, according to the table below.

Provinces
The provinces of Argolis were:
 Argos Province – Argos
 Ermionida Province – Kranidi
 Nafplia Province – Nafplio

Transport
The area is connected by highways:
 E65 (northwest)
 Greek National Road 7
 Greek National Road 70 (east)

Communications

Newspapers

 Argeiakon Bima – Argos
 Ta Nea tis Argolidos – Nafplio

Radio

 Argaiki Radiofonia – Argos
 Argos Radio Deejay – Argos – 96.2 FM
 Cool FM – Argos, Kefalari – 90.7 FM
 Dimotiko Radiofoniou Nafpliou – Nafplio
 Orange FM – Argos – 91.1 FM
 Radio Argolida – Nafplio – 90.2 FM
 Radio Ermionida – Ermioni
 Radio Kranidi – Kranidi
 Style 89.6 – Argos – 89.6 FM

Television

See also

 List of settlements in Argolis
 List of traditional Greek place names

References

Sources
 
 

 
Prefectures of Greece
1899 establishments in Greece
Regional units of Peloponnese (region)